The Ruf CTR (Group C, Turbo Ruf) also known as the CTR Yellowbird or simply Yellowbird, is a limited-production, high performance sports car manufactured by German automobile manufacturer Ruf Automobile. Introduced for the 1987 model year and based on the Porsche 911, the CTR featured an enlarged and highly tuned version of Porsche's 3.2 litre flat-six cylinder engine, lightened body panels, an integrated roll cage (adding chassis stiffness in addition to occupant safety), upgraded suspension and braking systems, a custom-designed transmission, and several unique trim pieces such as polyurethane bumpers, and the use of the side-mounted oil filler (a Porsche feature for the 1972 model year only) necessitated by relocating the oil tank forward to clear the intercooler on that side.

The car received its nickname, "Yellowbird", during testing by Road & Track magazine, whose staff members noted the contrast created by its yellow paintwork against the overcast skies on the day of their photo shoot.

History 

The CTR (abbreviation of "Group C Turbo Ruf") was based on the 1987 911 Carrera 3.2 as opposed to the 930; Porsche's factory turbocharged version of the 911. The decision to base the car on the Carrera 3.2 was made because of the 3.2's slightly lower curb weight and drag coefficient. Factory body panels including the doors, hood and engine cover were replaced with aluminum pieces, helping to reduce an additional  of weight as compared to the vehicle's factory curb weight. Efforts to reduce drag, the use of fiberglass front and rear bumpers and a pair of intake ducts on the rear flares to allow airflow to the intercoolers topped the list of body modifications. The rear arches were also slightly increased in width to accommodate the larger Speedline wheels.

At the time, Porsche offered the 911 3.2 with a 5-speed manual transmission, but the 930 featured only a 4-speed manual transmission, chosen because it was the only unit manufactured by the company that could handle the turbocharged engine's high power output. Not content with only four forward gears and unable to satisfactorily modify the 5-speed unit, Ruf chose to use a new five-speed transmission of their own design on the CTR, which also gave them full freedom to customise gear ratios. An upgraded suspension system, 17 inch Ruf Speedline alloy wheels,  diameter Brembo braking system, and Dunlop's Denloc system performance tyres were used.

The company debuted the vehicle at the end of 1987 with pricing set at US$142,900 (approx US$362,000 in 2022), although that number could vary depending on whether a given customer ordered it directly from Ruf or brought in a car purchased via dealer for conversion. Ruf manufactured only 29 cars from chassis bought from Porsche; about 20–30 cars were built from customers' Carreras.

Specifications 

Technical specificationsRoad & Track March 1991 
Engine configuration: Twin-turbocharged SOHC 2 valves per cylinder flat-six engine
Bore X Stroke: 
Displacement: 
Compression ratio: 7.5:1 
Power:  at 5,950 rpm
Torque:  at 5,100 rpm
Redline: 6,800 rpm
Curb weight: 
Gearbox: 5-speed manual transmission (6-speed optional)
Tyres: 215/45ZR-17 front, 255/40ZR-17 rear
Layout: Rear-engine, rear-wheel-drive.

Performance 

The CTR could generally outperform most of the other high performance cars of the time, including the Ferrari Testarossa and Lamborghini Countach. In addition, despite being slower than the Porsche 959 in accelerating from 0-60 mph, it could outperform the Porsche 959, Ferrari F40 and the Lamborghini Diablo accelerating from 0-100 mph and attain a higher top speed.

The CTR was also a highly competent track vehicle, and for several years it held the unofficial lap record at the Nürburgring-Nordschleife track.

Test results by Autocar:
 0–: 1.69 seconds
 0–: 3.65 seconds
 0–: 6.71 seconds
 0–: 14.59 seconds
 0–: 35.57 seconds
 Standing mile: 27.7 seconds at 
 0–100–0 mph: 11.85 seconds
 0–200–0 mph: 47.20 seconds

Test results by other magazines:
 0–: 4.1 seconds
 0–: 10.5 seconds
 Standing 1/4 mile (402 m): 11.7 s at  
 0–1,000 m: 20.9 seconds
 Top speed:

Other Media
The Ruf CTR had its first appearance in April 1987 at the "World's Fastest Cars" contest held by American car magazine Road & Track where it was designated "The Fastest Production Car in the World".
Editor Paul Frère shouted "This is faster than I've ever gone in my life!" during a ride.

In 1988, Auto Motor und Sport organized a high speed test at Nardò Ring where the Ruf CTR was the fastest reaching , surpassing a Porsche 959 s, two Ferrari F40s ( each) and a Mercedes AMG 6.0 32V. At one point it achieved an unofficial .

In 1989, test driver Stefan Roser drove the CTR around the Nürburgring. The laps were captured on camera and released by Ruf in a video called "Faszination on the Nürburgring" which became famous. Car & Driver called it groundbreaking, enthralling and influential and for Top Gear it's the best and most exciting lap for watching.

In 2004, a Ruf CTR was able to keep up with newer sports cars like the Porsche Carrera GT, the Enzo Ferrari and the Mercedes-Benz SLR McLaren at the Autocar 0-100-0 challenge and impressed the audience, so did another one - with more than 100,000 kilometers on its odometer - at the Road & Track standing mile contest 2005. Steve Millen, after testing a CTR, stated: "That thing's a blast. It accelerates hard. It's a real old-school car with a lot of torque and power. Just awesome. What a rush. It pulled the whole way through."

The Ruf CTR is a playable/drivable car in the video games "The Duel: Test Drive II", "Project Gotham Racing 3", "Project Gotham Racing 4", "Driver: San Francisco", "Forza Motorsport 4", "Forza Motorsport 5", "Forza Horizon", "Forza Horizon 2", "Assetto Corsa", "Project CARS", and most of the "Gran Turismo" series games.

Successor 
The CTR was succeeded in 1996 by the CTR2 based on Porsche's newer 993 Generation 911.

Revival

At the 87th Geneva Motor Show held from 9 to 19 March 2017, exactly 30 years after the original CTR was launched, Ruf presented a new model paying tribute to the original CTR. The car is not based on the 911, unlike the original CTR. Power is sent to the rear wheels through a 6-speed manual gearbox. The car also sports retro components based on the original CTR such as the 'whale tail' rear wing five-spoke wheels, interior and the steering wheel. Only 50 examples of the 2017 CTR will be produced.

References

External links 

Coupés
Rear-wheel-drive vehicles
CTR
Rear-engined vehicles
Cars powered by boxer engines
Cars introduced in 1987
Cars discontinued in 1996